Rabalsmellen is a mountain in Øystre Slidre Municipality in Innlandet county, Norway. The mountain is surrounded by several other notable mountains including Rundemellen, Kalvemellen, and Skarvemellen to the south.

See also
List of mountains of Norway by height

References

Øystre Slidre
Mountains of Innlandet